Abraham Sowden (1 December 1853 – 5 July 1921) was an English first-class cricketer, who played eight matches for Yorkshire County Cricket Club from 1878 to 1887, and for T Emmett's XI in 1881, plus an England XI against the Australians in 1902, when he was aged 48.

Born in Great Horton, Bradford, Yorkshire, England, and registered as Abram Sowden, he was a successful batsman for Bingley C.C. from 1875 to 1893 and for Bradford C.C. from 1893 to 1901.

In ten first-class matches he scored 163 runs, with a best score of 37 against Kent, and he took one catch.  He bowled right arm fast with a round arm action, but conceded 70 runs without success.

Sowden was a worsted manufacturer by trade, and died in July 1921 in Heaton, Yorkshire.

References

External links
Cricinfo Profile
Cricket Archive Statistics

1853 births
1921 deaths
Yorkshire cricketers
People from Great Horton
English cricketers
Sportspeople from Yorkshire